April Jace (born April Denise Laune; May 6, 1974 – May 19, 2014) was an American masters track and field athlete who ran in sprinting competitions. She was the 2011 world champion in the women's over-35 4 × 100 meters relay.

Early life
April Laune attended Hawthorne High School in Hawthorne, California. She attended college at California State University, Fullerton.

Athletic career
She ran with the Elite Health team and later with the Trojan Masters Club.  She was the 2013 Southern California USATF W35 champion at 100 meters.  She finished second in the W35 Invitational race at the Mt. SAC Relays behind only American record holder Joy Upshaw.  She was ranked as high as number 5 in the United States and was a 2011 World Championship finalist individually in the 100 meters and won a gold medal on the USA 4×100 meters relay team.

Personal life
She was the wife of actor Michael Jace. The couple were married for ten years and had two children.

Death and aftermath
Late in the evening on May 19, 2014, police were called to the couple's address in the 5400 block of Brynhurst Avenue, in the Hyde Park neighborhood of Los Angeles, where April was found shot to death. Michael was taken into custody the following day on suspicion of homicide; on May 22, he was charged with murder.

In the trial, based on detective interviews, Deputy District Attorney Tannaz Mokayef said "April Jace was an avid runner and the actor shot her in the legs because he wanted her to feel pain."

Later, Mokayef attributed another quote to her husband, “You like to run so much, why don’t you try running to heaven.”

On May 31, 2016, a jury convicted Michael of second-degree murder in the shooting death of April. On June 10, 2016, he was sentenced to 40 years to life in prison.  He is incarcerated at the California State Prison at Centinela, in Imperial County.

April's family released a statement to the Associated Press calling her shooting "a senseless act of domestic violence." Her memorial was held at the Oasis Church in Los Angeles, California. A GoFundMe page was created in support of her three children (aged 5, 8, and 18 at the time of her death).

She had previously worked for the LAUSD and was "a well- liked financial aid counselor" in Biola University's Financial Aid department at the time of her death. The office was closed in her memory, and the Director hailed her work ethic and service to the university's students. A memorial was held at the university's Calvary Chapel. Biola University has set up a Memorial Scholarship in her name.

References

External links
 Memorial page at Facebook
 Candid moments video at YouTube
 April Jace my friend tribute video at YouTube

1974 births
2014 deaths
African-American female track and field athletes
American female sprinters
Biola University
California State University, Fullerton alumni
Deaths by firearm in California
People murdered in California
Sportspeople from Hawthorne, California
Track and field athletes from California
20th-century African-American sportspeople
21st-century African-American sportspeople
20th-century African-American women
21st-century African-American women